Rico Puestel, also known as Dinamoe, Elco and Central Scrutinizer, is a German record producer, live-act, DJ and labelowner. Born in 1986, he early got in touch with different musical expressions, devices and behaviours - playing the piano, guitar and drums. He started spinning records and dealing with creative processing through various kinds of electronic music at the age of 12. He grew up in Uslar, Lower-Saxony. Since July 2007, he lives in Kiel and studies musicology and philosophy at the University.

In 2005 and 2006, he released his first EPs on the German labels Dark-Noize-Recordings and Minimal Sound Noise that were followed by his musical re-invention as Dinamoe two years later, initiated for developing his individual sound and to focus on mainly performing live.

He already cooperated with the labels Mothership, Pimprinella, OZZ, Freundchen, Archipel, Test Tube, ProgCity Deep Trax, Frankie Rec., Faste Music, Flicker Rhythm, Wreckless Recordings, Get Physical, Trapez, Cometomusic, IPOLY Music, Microtonal, Hi Freaks, Alpaca Records, Opossum Rec., Partyservice, Stop Clone Music, 9volt Musik, Minisketch, Robsoul Recordings, WirrWarr, Kostbar|Musik, Playtime Records, Malatoid Records, Naked Lunch, Manual Music, Niveous Tracks, Deep Series, Athletikk, Laka, Suara, Only Records, SNEJL, Shufflemood, Mischievous Musique, Multi Vitamins, Stolen Moments, Sui Generiz, Tanzbar|Digital, Schieber Prod., Minimal Sound Noise and Dark-Noize-Black Recordings while managing his own labels Ponsactrilau, Dinamuzac and Fabulesque! (on hold) where he presents his own productions and personal musical ideas.

Discography

Albums / EPs / Singles

 Rico Puestel: Senjor Soldjas / Eucharist - Dark-Noize-Black Recordings (DNB5001 12") - 2005
 Central Scrutinizer: And You All Didn't Get It / 139 - Dark-Noize-Black Recordings (DNB5003 12") - 2005
 Rico Puestel: Winterkaelte / Senjor Soldjas Rmx - Dark-Noize-Black Recordings (DNB5004 12") - 2005
 Rico Puestel: Binary EP - Minimal Sound Noise (MSN001 12") - 2006
 Central Scrutinizer: Something Must Happen / Côté Exposé Au Soleil - Minimal Sound Noise (MSN004 12") - 2006
 Dinamoe: Danser En Enfer / STL / Walk Warm, Feel Green - Schieber Productions (Schieber04 12") - 2007
 Dinamoe: Larissar II - Minisketch VIR (Minisketch VIR1.0 MP3) - 2007
 Dinamoe: Fabulesque - Fabulesque! (FBLSQ001 MP3) - 2007
 Rico Püstel: Les Désires - Fabulesque! (FBLSQ002 MP3) - 2007
 Dinamoe: Bivouac - Fabulesque! (FBLSQ003 MP3) - 2007
 Rico Püstel: Non-Non - Fabulesque! (FBLSQ004 MP3) - 2007
 Dinamoe: Lostin (incl. Ludovic Vendi Remix) - Minisketch VIR (Minisketch VIR1.1 MP3) - 2007
 Dinamoe: Fabulesque Remixes - Fabulesque! (FBLSQ005 MP3) - 2008
 Dinamoe: Poggenphot - Fabulesque! (FBLSQ006 MP3) - 2008
 Dinamoe: Simulacron 6.1 - Stolen Moments Digital (STMDIG 001 MP3) - 2008
 Dinamoe: Simulacron 6.2 - Stolen Moments Digital (STMDIG 002 MP3) - 2008
 Rico Püstel: Sone Auric - Fabulesque! (FBLSQ007 MP3) - 2008
 Dinamoe vs. Crosspatch: Geese I - Fabulesque! (FBLSQ008 MP3) - 2008
 Rico Puestel: A Divine Proclamation To Space And Time - Archipel (ARCH045 MP3) - 2008
 Dinamoe: FLIC - Fabulesque! (FBLSQ009 MP3) - 2008
 Dinamoe: Dab-Chat - 9volt Musik (9VOLT08 12") - 2008
 Rico Püstel: Nauic Rose - Fabulesque! (FBLSQ010 MP3) - 2008
 Dinamoe: When Peaches Spoke - Tanzbar|Digital (TANZBARDIGITAL006 MP3) - 2008
 Rico Puestel: Beyond Connexions, Crossing Sanctions - Mischievous Musique (MISCHIE001 MP3) - 2008
 Rico Puestel: Copm - Multi Vitamins (MVD02 MP3) - 2008
 Rico Puestel: IMHOTEP - Fabulesque! (FBLSQ011 MP3) - 2008
 Dinamoe: The Green French One (Body Language Vol. 7) - Get Physical (GPMLP025 12") - 2008
 Dinamoe: Lifeline EP - SNEJL (SNEJL006 MP3) - 2008
 Rico Puestel: Keyhole Pieces - Fabulesque! (FBLSQ012 MP3) - 2008
 Rico Puestel: Consequences Dictate - Shufflemood (SHFLMD002 MP3) - 2008
 Dinamoe: Crackerbarrels EP - Frankie Records (Frankie Rec 039 MP3) - 2008
 Dinamoe: 1986 - Minisketch: VIR (MVIR20 MP3) - 2008
 Dinamoe: A Baa Relenting EP - Manual Music (MANDIG015 MP3) - 2009
 Dinamoe: The Green French One Remixes - Fabulesque! (FBLSQ013 MP3) - 2009
 From Behind - Malatoid Records (MALATOID004 12"/MP3) - 2009
 Dinamoe: Bedpost Promise - 9volt Musik (9VOLT11 12") - 2009
 Dinamoe: Renaissance - Fabulesque! (FBLSQ014 MP3) - 2009
 Dinamoe: In My Totem EP - Stop Clone Music (SCM002 12") - 2009
 Dinamoe: Stakes EP - Alpaca Records (ALPC004 12") - 2009
 Dinamoe: A Keen Catastrophe #3 (Transformers 2) - Athletikk (ATHL009 MP3) - 2009
 Dinamoe: In My Totem EP [Digital] - Stop Clone Music (SCM002 MP3) - 2009
 Dinamoe: Born 1920 (VARIOUS ARTISTS Sampler) - Robsoul Recordings (Robsoul Ltd 20 12") - 2009
 Elco: Espäce D'Âne [EP] - Partyservice (Party 01 12") - 2009
 Rico Puestel: Have You Seen Baba Yaga? EP - Faste Music (FASTE06 12") - 2009
 Rico Püstel: Amatory - Test Tube (tube167 MP3) - 2009
 Dinamoe: Vicuna Robber Monk EP - Fabulesque! (FBLSQ016 MP3) - 2009
 Dinamoe: Monthurs [EP] - WirrWarr (wirrwarr02 12") - 2009
 Dinamoe: Pay-per-View EP - Only Records (ONLYD37 MP3) - 2009
 Rico Puestel: Floss [EP] - Wreckless Recordings (WRCK009 12") - 2009
 Rico Püstel: Islescape - Test Tube (tube188 MP3) - 2009
 Dinamoe: Nurse! - Playtime Records (PLY018 MP3) - 2009
 Dinamoe: Disequilibrium EP - Fabulesque! (FBLSQ017 MP3) - 2009
 Dinamoe: Woken If Youth (Shrimpy Remix) - Only Records (ONLYD39 MP3) - 2009
 Rico Puestel: Fax Verity EP - Niveous Tracks (NIT002 MP3) - 2009
 Rico Puestel: Vertical Eclipse / Ionic Ankle - Flicker Rhythm (DMDFLICKER21 12") - 2010
 Various Artists: Interstate 5 (incl. Dinamoe - Seattle) - Cometomusic (C2M002 12") - 2010
 Rico Puestel: The Hissing Subsides - ProgCity Deep Trax (PCDT015 12") - 2010
 Dinamoe: Vigor (Album CD) - 2010
 Dinamoe Vs. Rico Puestel: D99 - Cometomusic (C2M003 12") - 2010
 Various Artists: Deep Series Vol. 1 (incl. Dinamoe - Golden) - Deep Series (DS001-6 12") - 2010

Remixes

 Horrorscope: Sync (Rico Puestel Rmx) - Dark-Noize-Black Recordings (DNB5002 12") - 2005
 Manuel Fuentes: Oblivion (Rico Puestel Rmx) - Minimal Sound Noise (MSN005 12") - 2006
 Gauchel: Big Bass (Dinamoe Rmx) - Schieber.Net (Schieber.Net01 MP3) - 2010
 Fabrikat: Moody Harms (Boogie - Dinamoe Remix) - Deep In Rhythm (DIRNET006 MP3) - 2008
 Broombeck: Protect Your Neck (Dinamoe Neck Or Nothing Mix) - Opossum Rec. (OPSM018 12") - 2008
 Roberto Rodriguez: Camera Obscura Part II Remixed (Dinamoe Remix) - Laka (LAKA007-6 12") - 2008
 Maxime Miville: Runner's High EP (Dopamine [Rico Puestel Remix ]) - Archipel (ARCH061 MP3) - 2009
 Kerosene: The Transporter (Dinamoe Remix) - Force Inc. (FIM251 MP3) - 2009
 Grau: Sinergia (Rico Puestel Remix) - Shufflemood (SHFLMD029 MP3) - 2009
 Hans Bouffmyhre: Anger Management (Dinamoe's St. Anger Remix) - Stolen Moments (STM012 MP3) - 2009
 Estroe: Knetter (Dinamoe's Knitter Remix) - SNEJL (SNEJL010 MP3) - 2009
 Federico Milani: Minimarket (Dinamoe's Intimmarke Mix) - Sui Generiz (SGZ003 MP3) - 2009
 Mentalic: Frontrow Ticket (Dinamoe Remix) - IPOLY Music (IPOLY005 12") - 2009
 SQL: Wallpaper (Dinamoe Remix) - Microtonal Records (MICRO009 MP3) - 2009
 Sobamonk: Minimize (Rico Puestel Remix) - Littlebus Rec. (Littlebus009 MP3) - 2010
 Barou: Espoirs Clown (Dinamoe Remix) - Sui Generiz (SGZ014 MP3) - 2010

Compilation appearances

 And You All Didn't Get It - The Best In Schranz Vol. 2 (ZYX) - 2005
 And You All Didn't Get It - Schranzwerk 14 (ZYX) - 2005
 Eucharist - The Best In Techno Vol. 2 (ZYX) - 2005
 And You All Didn't Get It | Winterkaelte - Techno 2006 (ZYX) - 2006
 Senjor Soldjas - Techno Vol. 3 (ZYX) - 2006
 Binary | Something Must Happen | M. Fuentes - Oblivion (Rico Puestel Rmx) - MSN Labelcompilation Vol. 1 (ZYX) - 2006
 Côté Exposé Au Soleil - Techno 2007 (ZYX) - 2007
 Chief Redden - Triple R Selection 5 (Trapez) - 2007
 Walk Warm, Feel Green - Netraver.de Mix Series Vol. 2 (ZYX) - 2007
 Walk Warm, Feen Green - White Trash Vol. 8 (Pride) - 2007
 The Green French One | Light - Mother Of The Stars - Deepest Shades Of House Vol. 5 (Laka-Tosh) - 2007
 In Chenille | Infinite Ways - House My Beach (Itsibitsi) - 2008
 Big Swifty - Minimal Explosion Vol. 1 (Le Bien Et Le Mal) - 2008
 The Green French One - Body Language Vol. 7 by Matthew Dear (Get Physical) - 2008
 Corner #1 - Minimal Techno Stories Vol. 4 (Le Bien Et Le Mal) - 2008
 Beyond Them - Deepest Shades Of House Vol. 6 (Laka-Tosh) - 2008
 Six Bay Mares - Digital Freak (Hi Freaks) - 2008
 Eve - Precious Danceable Vol. 1 (Kostbar/Tanzbar) - 2008
 Media On - 24 Hours, 24 Moments (Suara) - 2008
 Caddies Caddy - Revised Moments Volume 1 (Stolen Moments) - 2009
 Alba (Qbical's Billenschud Remix) - Sound Shifting 2.0 (Manual Music) - 2009
 Boost Garden - Budenzauber Vol. 3 - 25 Minimal Techno Tracks (Budenzauber) - 2009
 Boost Garden - Minimal Techno Stories Vol. 5 (Le Bien Et Le Mal) - 2009
 Alba (Qbical's Billenschud Remix) - Tsugi 17 CD Sampler (Tsugi Magazine) - 2009
 Tu Me Manques - DJ Series Presents: Oscar (DJ Series) - 2009
 Maceo - Fabric 46 - Mixed by Claude Von Stroke (Fabric) - 2009
 Infinite Ways - Balearic Lounge Map - 2009
 Sketch In - Revised Moments Volume 2 (Stolen Moments) - 2009
 Corner #1 - Minimal Tunes Vol. 4 (Gastspiel) - 2009
 Make A Point Point Point - Budenzauber Vol. 6 - Life Is Wonderful (Budenzauber) - 2009
 Boost Garden - DOPPELGÄNGER presents Techno Underground Vol. 2 (Doppelgänger) - 2009
 Dippers - Just Techno Vol. 5 (Gastspiel) - 2009
 Dippers - Tretmuehle Presents A Beautiful World Volume 6 (Tretmuehle) - 2010
 Stakes - Hier Ist... Berlin 2 - German Electronic Underground Volume 5 (Tretmuehle) - 2010
 Vertical Eclipse - Ibiza Nightlife 2 (C47 Digital) - 2010
 Dippers - Tretmuehle Presents MINIMAL = MAXIMAL Volume 02 (Tretmuehle) - 2010
 Alba - 5 Years Of Manual Music Part 3/3 (Manual Music) - 2010
 Seattle - Minimal Techno Vol. 16 (Futureaudio) - 2010

External links
 Rico Puestel Website
 Rico Puestel MySpace Page
 Rico Puestel at Discogs

German record producers
German DJs
Living people
Electronic dance music DJs
Year of birth missing (living people)